Minuartia verna is a scarce species of flowering plant in the family Caryophyllaceae, known by the common names spring sandwort and leadwort. It is a small mat-forming, perennial herb. Some authorities consider it a synonym of Sabulina verna.

It has a Eurasian Boreal-montane distribution, typically found on Carboniferous limestone ground. It grows in short grassland, on exposed limestone pavement, on scree slopes and on metal-rich soils, including spoil heaps from lead mining.

The small (7–9 mm across), 5-petalled flowers appear on short, downy stems from spring until late summer. The slender leaves have 3 veins.

References 

verna
Flora of the United Kingdom